Little Mahanoy Township is a township in Northumberland County, Pennsylvania, United States. The population at the 2010 Census was 479, a decline from the figure of 435 tabulated in 2000.

Geography

According to the United States Census Bureau, the township has a total area of 10.4 square miles (27.1 km2), all  land.

Demographics
As of the census of 2000, there were 435 people, 151 households, and 109 families residing in the township.  The population density was 41.6 people per square mile (16.1/km2).  There were 159 housing units at an average density of 15.2/sq mi (5.9/km2).  The racial makeup of the township was 99.08% White, 0.23% African American, 0.23% Asian, and 0.46% from two or more races.

There were 151 households, out of which 35.1% had children under the age of 18 living with them, 63.6% were married couples living together, 6.6% had a female householder with no husband present, and 27.8% were non-families. 25.2% of all households were made up of individuals, and 15.2% had someone living alone who was 65 years of age or older.  The average household size was 2.88 and the average family size was 3.52.

In the township the population was spread out, with 32.9% under the age of 18, 7.1% from 18 to 24, 23.9% from 25 to 44, 20.9% from 45 to 64, and 15.2% who were 65 years of age or older.  The median age was 36 years. For every 100 females, there were 96.8 males.  For every 100 females age 18 and over, there were 87.2 males.

The median income for a household in the township was $36,667, and the median income for a family was $45,500. Males had a median income of $32,639 versus $18,125 for females. The per capita income for the township was $14,844.  About 5.4% of families and 5.9% of the population were below the poverty line, including 5.4% of those under age 18 and 10.9% of those age 65 or over.

References

External links

Populated places established in 1777
Townships in Northumberland County, Pennsylvania
Townships in Pennsylvania